Thomas Poole is a professor of law at LSE since 2015.

Works

References

Academics of the London School of Economics